A Comprehensive Guide to Moderne Rebellion is the second album by the Santa Cruz, California-based hardcore punk band Good Riddance, released June 4, 1996, through Fat Wreck Chords. It was the band's first album with drummer Sean Sellers, replacing Rich McDermott who had left the group. The album includes two cover songs, of The Kinks' "Come Dancing" and Government Issue's "Hall of Fame", the latter included as a hidden track. "Last Believer" was titled after an episode of the 1991 PBS documentary series on President Lyndon B. Johnson; the song had previously been released on the band's debut EP Gidget in 1993 and was re-recorded for A Comprehensive Guide to Moderne Rebellion.

Singer Russ Rankin later remarked that "I think [A Comprehensive Guide to Moderne Rebellion] is important because that's when I found out that I was a song-writer ... [it] was where I realized like, 'Hey I guess I'm the song writer for this band.

Seven songs written during the demo sessions for A Comprehensive Guide to Moderne Rebellion were left off of the album. These tracks—"Remember When", "Flawed", "Class War 2000", "Twenty-One Guns", "Lame Duck Arsenal", "Off the Wagon", and "What We Have"—were recorded in a separate session with Andy Ernst at Art of Ears and released on split EPs with Reliance, Ignite, Ill Repute, and Ensign through other record labels over the following year.

Reception 
Andy Hinds of Allmusic rated A Comprehensive Guide to Moderne Rebellion four stars out of five, remarking that "the band have improved their songwriting chops considerably, finally bringing the music up to the level of Russ Rankin's always powerful lyrics".

Track listing

Personnel 
 Russ Rankin – vocals, additional guitar on "Come Dancing"
 Luke Pabich – guitar
 Chuck Platt – bass guitar
 Sean Sellers – drums
 Cinder Block – female vocals on "A Credit to His Gender"
 Ryan Greene – producer, recording engineer, mix engineer

References

External links 
A Comprehensive Guide to Moderne Rebellion at Fat Wreck Chords

Good Riddance (band) albums
1996 albums
Fat Wreck Chords albums
Albums produced by Ryan Greene